Rhinogobius niger is a small benthic species in the goby subfamily Gobionellinae endemic to Zhejiang Province, China. It was discovered in 2002 and scientifically described and assigned a binomial taxonomic name in 2016.

Description 
Rhinogobius niger is a freshwater benthic fish with united pelvic fins that form a sucking disk. It can be distinguished from its congeners by its lack of a cheek stripe, and by two horizontal reddish brown stripes running front to back on the head just behind the eyes. Additionally, males have small reddish orange spots as adults, and all R. niger have a large black mark on the first dorsal fin. Adult fish measure 28.3–42.3 mm (1.1–2.7 in) SL.

Distribution 
The type locality of Rhinogobius niger is from the Yong’an Brook, a tributary of the Ling River, Pan’an County, Zhejiang Province, China.

References 

niger
Freshwater fish of China
Endemic fauna of China
Fish described in 2016

Taxa named by Chen I-Shiung
Taxa named by Shao Kwang-Tsao